Silvio Alberto (Tip) Marugg (16 December 1923 in Willemstad, Curaçao – 22 April 2006) was a Dutch-Curaçaoan writer and poet of Venezuelan/Swiss heritage. His novel De morgen loeit weer aan (1988) was nominated for a major Dutch literature prize. His style is best characterized as a variation on magic realism. Marugg also wrote several poems (published in literary magazines as well as his book of poems Afschuw van Licht) and a Dikshonario Erotiko; a dictionary of all words with an erotic meaning used in Papiamentu.

Bibliography
 1957 - Weekendpelgrimage
 1967 - In de straten van Tepalka
 1976 - Afschuw van licht; gedichten 1946-1951 (poems)
 1988 - De morgen loeit weer aan (English: "The roar of morning")
 1992 - Un prinsipio pa un dikshonario erótiko papiamentu
 2009 - De hemel is van korte duur

References 

1923 births
2006 deaths
Curaçao writers
Curaçao people of Swiss descent
Curaçao people of Venezuelan descent
People from Willemstad